Pacific Broadcasting Services is a company jointly owned by City West Centre Broadcasting Services and BPHCL. Its core business is to deliver satellite subscription television and radio broadcasting services to the Fiji Islands and surrounding markets, focussing on both Hindi and English speaking households and commercial outlets.

The company officially opened business in March 2005. The company is located in Garden City, a growing business district of Suva, the capital of Fiji where it runs its local operation in Sales and Marketing, Customer Care Centre, Service and Installation and Finance. Its Technical Infrastructure and engineering support is based in Sydney, Australia.

PBS TV currently broadcasts on the Intelsat 701 satellite broadcasting to the Fiji Islands with 13 TV Channels and one radio channel. Channels are beamed from Sydney, Australia from the City West Centre where all PBS TV channels are received and broadcast to the Intelsat 18 satellite to be viewed in Fiji.

Pacific Broadcasting Services recently acquired a television broadcasting licence in Fiji to commence broadcasting a nationwide Free To Air channel for Fijian viewers.

In June 2008 PBS started to roll out new technology upgrades to their systems, specifically a new CAS system for their pay television platform.

PBS closed its operations in Fiji and turned off its satellite transmission in July 2012. Consumer Council of Fiji CEO Premila Kumar said PBS had taken money in advance from subscribers and failed to provide services which was illegal.

Channels

Pacific Broadcasting Services Currently offers these channels for subscription: 	 
		 
English Channels:
 Eurosport Asia Pacific
 AXN Asia
 Nickelodeon
 Australia Plus
 Sony Channel (Asia)
 National Geographic
 Nat Geo Wild
 Nat Geo People
 Al Jazeera English
 Times Now
 Animax
 Channel NewsAsia
 euronews
 FashionTV
 MTV Asia
 HBO
 Cinemax
 RED by HBO
 FOX Life
 FOX Movies
 Fox Action Movies
 Fox Family Movies
 Baby TV
 Nick Jr.

Eastern Asian Channels:
 STAR Chinese Channel
 STAR Chinese Movies
 tvN
 KBS World

Indian Channels:
 Zee TV
 Colors
 Star Utsav
 Star Gold
 &TV
 STAR Bharat
 Zee News
 Zee Cinema
 STAR Plus
 Sony SAB
 NDTV India
 MTV India
 STAR Vijay
 Sony MAX
 Sony Entertainment Television (India)

Radio Channels:
 BBC World Service
 AIR FM Gold

External links
 Official site 
 Internet archive of official site

References 

Television stations in Fiji